Chad Stahelski (born September 20, 1968) is an American stuntman and film director. He is known for directing the 2014 film John Wick and directing its three sequels. He has worked as a stuntman, stunt coordinator and second unit director on several films.

Career 
Stahelski worked on Alex Proyas' The Crow (1994). Stahelski and fellow stuntman Jeff Cadiente served as a double for the actor Brandon Lee. Previously on March 31, 1993, while filming, Lee was accidentally wounded on set by defective blank ammunition and later died in hospital during surgery. Special effects were used to superimpose Lee's face onto Stahelski. This pioneering CGI technique paved the way for deceased actors to complete projects or appear in new performances.

In 1997, Stahelski co-founded action design company 87Eleven with David Leitch.

He worked as a stunt double for his future John Wick star Keanu Reeves in The Matrix franchise, and later served as a stunt co-ordinator for the films. In 2009, Stahelski was second-unit director and stunt co-ordinator on Ninja Assassin along with David Leitch.

In 2012, on the set of the film The Expendables 2 for which Stahelski served as stunt coordinator, stuntman Kun Liu was killed by an explosion on set. Liu's family sued Stahelski following the accident.

In 2014, Stahelski co-directed the action thriller film John Wick along with Leitch, based on the screenplay by Derek Kolstad. The film starred Keanu Reeves and Michael Nyqvist, and was released on October 24, 2014 by Summit Entertainment, grossing over $88 million.

Stahelski acted as sole director for the film's 2017 sequel, John Wick: Chapter 2, and again for the third film, John Wick: Chapter 3 – Parabellum (2019).

In 2019, Stahelski was the second unit director for the reshoots of Birds of Prey.

In November 2017, he was signed on to the reboot of the Highlander franchise, which he committed to making a trilogy of, ending with "The Gathering" of the immortals. It would be similar in thematic development with the original Star Wars trilogy, and similar to John Wick action, but with swords replacing gun-play. The reboot trilogy would still include the iconic music by Queen.

In December 2017, it was announced that Stahelski would be directing a film adaptation of the comic book Kill or Be Killed.

In February 2018, it was announced that Stahelski would be directing a film adaptation of the Sandman Slim novels.

In May 2018, Stahelski was announced as director of Analog.

In May 2019, Stahelski was confirmed to be directing John Wick: Chapter 4, which is set for release on March 24, 2023.

In March 2021, it was announced that Stahelski would direct a film adaptation of Ghost of Tsushima.

Personal life 
Stahelski was married to fellow stunt performer Heidi Moneymaker, but they divorced in 2018. She worked as Scarlett Johansson's double in Black Widow, and appeared on Stahelski's film John Wick: Chapter 2. 

Stahelski was a friend of Brandon Lee. They trained together at the Inosanto Academy.

Filmography 

Second-unit director

Stuntwork

Actor

References

External links 
 

1968 births
Living people
American people of Polish descent
American film directors
American stunt performers
American Jeet Kune Do practitioners
American male kickboxers
American male film actors
Place of birth missing (living people)
American film producers
Action film directors
20th-century American male actors
21st-century American male actors